Cyril Francis Davie (January 30, 1882 – February 18, 1950) was a lawyer and political figure in British Columbia, Canada. He represented Cowichan-Newcastle in the Legislative Assembly of British Columbia from 1924 to 1933 as a Conservative.

He was born in Victoria, the son of Alexander Edmund Batson Davie and Constance L. Skinner, and was educated at the University of Ottawa. Davie married Beatrice Pearl Raymond in 1911. He was speaker for the assembly from 1931 to 1933. Davie was defeated when he ran for reelection in 1933. He lived in Duncan.

Davie wrote a chess column for the Daily Colonist in Victoria for a number of years. He founded the Canadian branch of the Chess Amateur
Correspondence League and organized the first chess championship held in Canada.

Davie died in Duncan at the age of 67.

References 

1882 births
1950 deaths
Speakers of the Legislative Assembly of British Columbia
British Columbia Conservative Party MLAs
University of Ottawa alumni